The 13th Cabinet of North Korea was elected by the 1st Session of the 13th Supreme People's Assembly on 9 April 2014. It was replaced on 11 April 2019 by the 14th Cabinet.

Members

References

Citations

Bibliography
Books:
 

13th Supreme People's Assembly
Cabinet of North Korea
2014 establishments in North Korea
2019 disestablishments in North Korea